Adesh Institute of Medical Science and Research (AIMSR) is a private medical college associated with a 750-bed tertiary care teaching hospital. It has 150 M.B.B.S. annual seat intake. The college is located on the Barnala Bathinda Highway in the district Bathinda of Punjab, India. The college was established in 2006 under Adesh Institutions. AIMSR is approved by Medical Council of India and permitted by Ministry of Health & Family Welfare. It was affiliated to Baba Farid University of Health Sciences, Faridkot from 2006 to 2011 MBBS Admissions Batch and is affiliated to Adesh University, Bathinda starting 2012 MBBS Admissions Batch.

Affiliated university
From 2006 to 2011 Admission Year Batches it was affiliated with Baba Farid University of Health Sciences

2012 Admission Year Batch to Current : Adesh University, Bathinda

Recognitions
AIMSR is approved by the Medical Council of India, Ministry of Health and Family Welfare, Govt. of India

Awards 
Adesh University, Bathinda, the currently affiliated university was awarded the "Six Sigma Healthcare Excellence Award" – Oscars of Indian Healthcare, under the category "Best Healthcare Academic Institution of the Year" in December 2015.

FAIMER listing 

The medical college is listed in the Foundation for Advancement of International Medical Education and Research (FAIMER) World Directory of Medical Schools with FAIMER SCHOOL ID: F0002061

Arrhythmia 
  
The college organises an annual sports week cum cultural fest known as Arrhythmia.

References

Hospitals in Punjab, India
Medical colleges in Punjab, India
Bathinda district
Private medical colleges in India
Educational institutions established in 2006
2006 establishments in Punjab, India